Zhu Ling (born 1973) photo is best known as the victim of an unsolved 1995 thallium poisoning case in Beijing, China. Her symptoms were posted to the Internet via a Usenet newsgroup by her friend from Peking University, Bei Zhicheng, and were subsequently proven to be caused by thallium poisoning. Her case was then reviewed by physicians in many different countries who examined her symptoms and made suggestions as to diagnoses and treatment. This effort was recognized as the first large scale tele-medicine trial. Her life was ultimately saved, but she suffered serious neurological damage and permanent physical impairment.

This case drew great attention in the Chinese media, because the victim and the suspect were living in the same dormitory in the most prestigious university in China, and in addition the case was never solved. Internet discussion of the crime has continued since then and became a hot topic on major online Chinese communities very frequently as a high-profile cold case.

Poisoning case
In 1994, Zhu Ling was a sophomore in Class Wuhua2 (Class 2 majored in physical chemistry) at Tsinghua University in Beijing. Classmates described her as attractive, intelligent, and talented, with an interest in music. She began to show strange and debilitating symptoms at the end of 1994, when she reported experiencing acute stomach pain, along with extensive hair loss. Following her hospitalization at TongRen Hospital, her condition gradually improved and she was allowed to return to school. The following March, however, her old symptoms returned worse than before, this time accompanied by pain in her legs, loss of muscular eye control, and partial facial paralysis. Unable to breathe on her own, she was placed on a respirator.

One physician at Peking Union Medical College Hospital (PUMCH), Dr. Li Shun-wei, reported having diagnosed a similar poisoning case in the 1960s and strongly suspected that Zhu Ling's symptoms were caused by thallium poisoning. However, Zhu Ling denied that she had had any contact with thallium in class, a claim which was confirmed by her university's chemistry department. As a result, her doctors ruled out thallium poisoning as a potential cause. Instead, she was diagnosed with and treated for Guillain–Barré syndrome. Her condition deteriorated rapidly.

Diagnosis via Internet
Frustrated with local physicians' inability to help Zhu Ling, her friends Cai Quanqing and Bei Zhicheng, undergraduate students in Peking University, posted an "SOS" letter on a number of Internet Usenet groups on April 10, 1995, describing their friend's symptoms and asking for help with a diagnosis. It was remarkable that by 1995 only a few research institutes in China had Internet connections, including Cai's advisor. Responses began pouring in within a matter of hours, and news reports hailed the event as a milestone in remote diagnosis by Internet, especially in China. Of the more than 1,500 responses which Zhu Ling's friends received, roughly one-third proposed that she was suffering from thallium poisoning, the common antidote for which is known as Prussian blue.

Subsequent tests confirmed that Zhu Ling had extraordinarily high levels of thallium in her body, about 10,000 times more than normal people. Doctors were able to administer the antidote, Prussian blue in time to save her life, but she sustained serious permanent neurological damage. While she has recovered the ability to breathe on her own, she still cannot speak and remains largely paralyzed and almost blind, with severely reduced mental function. In addition, she has contracted Hepatitis C from a tainted blood transfusion.

Hair Analysis

Zhu Ling’s parents have collected a small number of hairs from a blanket used by her during the poisoning period (1994-1995) and stored them in a plastic bag since. These samples were obtained by Min He, who, through collaboration with Richard Ash at the University of Maryland, reconstituted the original poisoning process using LA-ICP-MS. The results were published in Forensic Science International in 2018. In summary, it appears that Zhu Ling had suffered ~4 months of repeated exposure to thallium with increased doses and frequency towards the end, as well as ~2 weeks of constant ingestions of large doses of thallium accompanied by an elevated amount of lead. The overall thallium distribution profiles in the analyzed hairs suggested both chronic and acute thallium exposures that correlated well with the sequential presentation of a plethora of symptoms originally experienced by Zhu Ling. Aligning the time-resolved thallium peaks in the hair with her symptoms also provided clues on possible routes of exposure at different poisoning stages.

Police investigation
The police began investigating the case in May 1995. It was not until January 2006 that police finally revealed to the media that their initial investigations had yielded a possible suspect. No explanation was given for the delay in releasing this information, and no one has yet been formally charged in connection with the case. The primary investigator, Li Shusen, told a correspondent from Southern People Weekly in a January 2006 phone interview that investigators have in fact reached some important conclusions regarding the case, but that the information is too sensitive to be released to the public at this time.

Suspect
The main suspect after police investigation is Sun Wei (孙维) (born ), who was Zhu Ling's classmate and roommate in Tsinghua University from 1992 to 1997. Tsinghua University also said Sun Wei was the only student who would have had official access to thallium compound among the students with close relationship to Zhu Ling, according to Zhu Ling's lawyer, Zhang Jie. The authorities refused to release the results of their investigation to Zhu Ling's parents after they appealed. However, Tsinghua University denied to issue Sun Wei's B.S. certificate and refused to provide her a document needed to get a passport or visa in 1997. It is believed Sun Wei has changed her name to Sun Shiyan (孙释颜).

The case began to draw extensive public attention near the end of 2005, after an ID named "skyoneline" posted on one of the largest Chinese online bulletin boards, Tianya Club, again questioning the innocence of the suspect and her family's role in blocking investigation and prosecution of the case. In response, after over ten years of silence, on December 30, 2005, the main suspect Sun Wei released a statement proclaiming her innocence, which was confirmed by a weekly newspaper, Qingnian Zhoumo after interviewing Sun Wei's father in 2006.

According to the statement, the suspect was identified as the only student with official access to thallium in her experiment for undergraduate research. She was detained by the police department on April 2, 1997, and signed a paper acknowledging she was a suspect. Sun Wei's family retrieved her from the police after eight hours of interrogation. In her statement, she also claimed that, according to the law, she was cleared as a suspect in August 1998. However, in a Morning News Post report dated March 2006, Zhu Ling's lawyer, Zhang Jie said of the suspect, "She was only exempted from the compulsory measure that she was subjected to as a suspect at that time, but not excluded from suspicion."

Internet discussion of the crime continues since then and became hot topic on major online Chinese communities frequently as a high-profile unsolved case. A hacker who claimed he had hacked into the email account of one of Sun Wei's classmates, revealed communications purporting to be between Sun and several of her classmates, showing Sun Wei was guiding them how to post on forums to declare her innocence and they were preparing for Sun's statement in 2005. Among the Internet users in the discussion, many people speculate that the main suspect has not been charged due to her family connections. Sun Wei's grandfather is Sun Yueqi (孙越崎) who was an important member of Chinese People's Political Consultative Conference as a senior leader of Revolutionary Committee of the Chinese Kuomintang and her first cousin once removed, Sun Fuling was deputy mayor of Beijing from 1983 to 1993 and Vice Chairperson of the Chinese People's Political Consultative Conference from 1998 to 2003.

2013 White House Petition
An online White House Petition on the whitehouse.gov website was created on May 3, 2013, demanding investigation on the major suspect who was believed living in the US at the time. The number of the signatures reached its 100,000 goal three days later after it was created. This online campaign also drew great attention from US and Chinese mainstream media towards Zhu Ling's family and the cold case.

On July 28, 2015, the White House declined to comment on the petition's request, saying "Zhu Ling's poisoning in 1995 was a tragedy. No young person deserves to suffer as she has, and we can understand the heartbreak of those close to her. We decline, however, to comment on the specific request in your petition. As the We the People Terms of Participation explain, to "avoid the appearance of improper influence, the White House may decline to address certain procurement, law enforcement, adjudicatory, or similar matters properly within the jurisdiction of federal departments or agencies, federal courts, or state and local government."

Symbolic significance
Widespread awareness by the Chinese public and cynicism regarding the matter and the alleged whitewashing of it pose public relations problems for the government of China. Information regarding the matter is too widespread to suppress, but, at the same time, evidence adequate to establish the guilt or innocence of the primary suspect is probably unavailable. Thus the matter serves as a vehicle for expression of public dissatisfaction with corruption and abuse of power by the political elite associated with the regime.

Notes

References
 Bei Zhicheng, Cai Quanqing  SoS letter for Zhu Ling posted on Usenet April 10, 1994
 Yu Chih-Ho, Huang Ning China - Mystery Ailment Diagnosed Via Internet Newsbytes News Network, Sept 8, 1995
 Yu Renfei Zhu Ling's lawyers involved to collect evidences   News Morning Post, March 14, 2006
 Jessie Tao Campus poisoning mystery triggers debate China Daily: English Version, January 13, 2006
 Wu Hongfei, et al. Ten-year unresolved poisoning case: the suspect is said to have special background Southern People Weekly, January 11, 2006

External links
Help Zhu Ling Foundation
 Youtube video: Who poisoned Zhu Ling? Documentation with English subtitle, made by huaren.us users, retrieved on April 27, 2013
  One of the original Usenet posts asking for help]
 Sun Wei's first statement on Tianya Club (in Chinese, "孙维的声明－－驳斥朱令铊中毒案件引发的谣言"), December 30, 2005, retrieved on April 19, 2013
 Sun Wei's second statement on Tianya Club (in Chinese, "声明:要求重新侦查，为"窃听器"错误向网友和公安道歉"), January 13, 2006, retrieved on April 19, 2013
 The whole story about the Poisoning of Zhu Ling (in Chinese, "朱令被投毒事件始末", PDF file)

People from Beijing
1973 births
Living people
Tsinghua University alumni
Thallium poisoning
Internet-based activism
Chinese physical chemists
1995 crimes in China
Unsolved crimes in China